Mao Kao-wen (9 February 1936 Fenghua, Ningbo – 28 October 2019 Taipei) was a Taiwanese chemist, politician, and diplomat. He served as the president of National Tsinghua University from 1981 to 1987. He also was the Minister of Education of the Republic of China from June 1987 to February 1993.

Mao died on 28 October 2019 at the Taipei Veterans General Hospital, aged 83.

References 

|-

|-

1936 births
2019 deaths
Affiliated Senior High School of National Taiwan Normal University alumni
National Taiwan University alumni
Politicians from Ningbo
Kuomintang politicians in Taiwan
Taiwanese Ministers of Education
Ambassadors of the Republic of China to Costa Rica
Republic of China politicians from Zhejiang
Educators from Ningbo
Presidents of National Tsing Hua University
Taiwanese people from Zhejiang
Taiwanese chemical engineers